Douglas 'Doogie' Campbell Thomson (born 24 March 1951) is a Scottish musician, born in Glasgow and raised in the Rutherglen area of the city. He was the bass guitarist of progressive rock band Supertramp during much of the seventies and eighties.

Career
Thomson's musical career began in August 1969, when he joined a local Glaswegian band "The Beings". 
In September 1971 he joined The Alan Bown Set where he briefly worked with future Supertramp colleague, John Helliwell. In February 1972, Thomson auditioned for Supertramp, and ended up playing several gigs as a temporary stand-in.

In 1973, Thomson permanently joined Supertramp and helped in the business management with Dave Margereson; he also persuaded John Helliwell to join the band.

Thomson played with Supertramp on all of their most famous albums: Crime of the Century, Crisis? What Crisis?, Even in the Quietest Moments, Breakfast in America, Paris, ...Famous Last Words..., Brother Where You Bound and Free as a Bird.

On the back cover of Breakfast in America was a photograph showing Thomson reading the Glasgow Herald.

Thomson was a member of Supertramp until the band went on hiatus in 1988; He didn’t return to the band once the hiatus ended. Dougie Thomson played a Music Man StingRay, a Rickenbacker 4001 and a Fender Jazz Bass during his time with Supertramp.

He has since become a publisher in the music business, creating Trinity Publishing, and worked with a Chicago, Illinois management company.

Thomson has four children, Laura, James, Kyle and Emma. Kyle Thomson played one game of football for the Scottish team Greenock Morton in 2018.

Thomson is the older brother of Ali Thomson.

References

External Links
 
 

1951 births
Living people
Scottish bass guitarists
Supertramp members
Musicians from Glasgow
People from Rutherglen
Scottish expatriates in the United States
People from Park Ridge, Illinois
The Alan Bown Set members